Persicaria orientalis is a species of flowering plant in the family Polygonaceae, known as kiss-me-over-the-garden-gate and princess-feather. It was first described,  as Polygonum orientale, by Carl Linnaeus in 1753. It was transferred to the genus Persicaria by Édouard Spach in 1841. Its native distribution is unclear. , Plants of the World Online lists only Uzbekistan, whereas other sources give a much wider distribution in temperate and tropical Asia and Australia. It is widely cultivated and naturalized.

References

orientalis
Flora of temperate Asia
Flora of tropical Asia
Flora of Australia
Plants described in 1753
Taxa named by Carl Linnaeus